Terence Michael Penelhum (26 April 1929 – 26 February 2020) was a British-Canadian philosopher and writer, known for his work on the philosophy of religion, personal identity and Hume.

Biography 
Penelhum was born in Bradford-on-Avon. His early education was received at Weymouth Grammar School, he then went on to study for an M.A. in Philosophy at the University of Edinburgh in 1950 and a B.Phil in philosophy from Oriel College, Oxford in 1952.

He married Edith Andrews in 1950; they had two children. Penelhum became a Canadian citizen in 1961. He was appointed associate professor at University of Alberta (1953–1956) and Professor of Philosophy at the University of Calgary (1963–1978) where he was Professor of Religious Studies (1978–1988). After retiring from the University of Calgary, in 1988, he received the title Professor Emeritus of Religious Studies.

Penelhum was best known for his books Survival and Disembodied Existence (1970) and Religion and Rationality (1971). In Survival and Disembodied Existence, Penelhum examines the intelligibility of the belief that persons can survive death in two forms, disembodied survival and bodily resurrection.

He received honorary doctorates from the universities of Calgary, Lakehead, Lethbridge and Waterloo. He received the Alberta Achievement Award (1987) and the Canada Council Molson Prize for the Humanities and Social Sciences (1988).

Penelhum's wife died in 2016; he died on 26 February 2020.

Selected publications
Survival and Disembodied Existence (1970)
Problems of Religious Knowledge (1971)
Religion and Rationality (1971)
God and Scepticism (1983)
David Hume: An Introduction to his Philosophical System (1992)
Reason and Religious Faith (1995)
Christian Ethics and Human Nature (1999)
Themes in Hume (2000)

References

1929 births
2020 deaths
Alumni of Oriel College, Oxford
Alumni of the University of Edinburgh
20th-century Canadian male writers
20th-century Canadian philosophers
21st-century Canadian male writers
21st-century Canadian philosophers
20th-century English male writers
20th-century English philosophers
21st-century English male writers
21st-century English philosophers
English emigrants to Canada
Hume scholars
People educated at Weymouth Grammar School
People from Bradford-on-Avon
Philosophers of identity
Philosophers of religion